The followers of Mahatma Gandhi, the greatest figure of the Indian independence movement, are called Gandhians. 

Gandhi's legacy includes a wide range of ideas ranging from his dream of ideal India (or Rama Rajya), economics, environmentalism, women rights, animal rights, spirituality, the truth, nonviolence, asceticism and others. Thus Gandhians hailing from wide range of work profile attribute their ideas to him. 

An overwhelming number of Bharat Ratna awardees are such individuals. In a 2012 poll called The Greatest Indian, the jury decided to keep Gandhi out as it "is impossible for anyone to come close to the father of the nation when it comes to leadership, impact and contribution". The poll included as many as 10 individuals in top 20 who were either close aides, disciples, successors or Gandhian idealogues.

Notes

References

Mahatma Gandhi
Gandhians